Chichimeca is the name that the Nahua peoples of Mexico generically applied to nomadic and semi-nomadic peoples who were established in present-day Bajío region of Mexico. Chichimeca carried the meaning as the Roman term "barbarian" that described Germanic tribes. The name, with its pejorative sense, was adopted by the Spanish Empire. For the Spanish, in the words of scholar Charlotte M. Gradie, "the Chichimecas were a wild, nomadic people who lived north of the Valley of Mexico. They had no fixed dwelling places, lived by hunting, wore little clothes and fiercely resisted foreign intrusion into their territory, which happened to contain silver mines the Spanish wished to exploit." They practiced animal sacrifice, and they were feared for their expertise and brutality in war.

The Chichimeca War (1550-1590) ended with the Spanish making favorable peace terms with the Chichimeca. Spanish/Chichimeca interaction resulted in a "drastic population decline in population of all the peoples known collectively as Chichimecas, and to their eventual disappearance as peoples of all save the Pames of San Luis Potosí and the related Chichimeca-Jonaz of the Sierra Gorda in eastern Guanajuato." In modern times, only one ethnic group is customarily referred to as Chichimecs, namely the Chichimeca Jonaz, a few thousand of whom live in the state of Guanajuato.

Etymology 
The Nahuatl name Chīchīmēcah (plural, pronounced ; singular Chīchīmēcatl) means "inhabitants of Chichiman," Chichiman meaning "area of milk." It is sometimes said to be related to chichi "dog", but both i'''s in chichi are short, and both in Chīchīmēcah are long. That changes the meaning, as vowel length is phonemic in Nahuatl.

Ethnohistorical descriptions
In the late sixteenth century, Gonzalo de las Casas wrote about the Chichimec. He had received an encomienda near Durango and fought in the wars against the Chichimec peoples: the Pame, the Guachichile, the Guamari and the Zacateco, who lived in the area known at the time as "La Gran Chichimeca." Las Casas' account was called Report of the Chichimeca and the Justness of the War Against Them. He described the people, providing ethnographic information. He wrote that they only covered their genitalia with clothing; painted their bodies; and ate only game, roots and berries. He mentioned, in order to prove their supposed barbarity, that Chichimec women, having given birth, continued traveling on the same day without stopping to recover.

In the late 16th century, according to the Spanish, the Chichimeca did not worship idols as did many of the surrounding indigenous peoples.

Wars with the Spanish

Chichimeca military strikes against the Spanish included raidings, ambushing critical economic routes, and pillaging. In the long-running Chichimeca War (1550–1590), the Spanish initially attempted to defeat the combined Chichimeca peoples in a war of "fire and blood", but eventually sought peace as they were unable to defeat them. The Chichimeca's small-scale raids proved effective. To end the war, the Spanish adopted a "Purchase for Peace" program by providing foods, tools, livestock, and land to the Chichimecas, sending Spanish to teach them agriculture as a livelihood, and by converting them to Catholicism. Within a century, the Spanish and Chichimeca assimilated.

References

Sources
 
 Gradie, Charlotte M. "Chichimec." In Davíd Carrasco (ed).The Oxford Encyclopedia of Mesoamerican Cultures''. : Oxford University Press, 2001. 
 
 
 
 
 
 
 

Indigenous peoples of Aridoamerica
Pre-Columbian cultures of Mexico
History of Coahuila
History of Guanajuato
History of Jalisco
History of Michoacán
History of San Luis Potosí
History of Zacatecas
History of Sonora
Barbarians
Nomadic groups in the Americas